The 2021–22 Southeastern Louisiana Lions basketball team represented Southeastern Louisiana University during the 2021–22 NCAA Division I men's basketball season. The Lions are led by third-year head coach David Kiefer, and played their home games at the University Center in Hammond, Louisiana as members of the Southland Conference.

Previous season 
In a season limited due to the ongoing COVID-19 pandemic, the Lions finished the 2020–21 season 8–18, 5–10 in Southland play to finish in ninth place. They defeated McNeese State in the first round of the Southland tournament before losing to New Orleans.

Roster

Schedule and results

|-
!colspan=9 style=| Non-conference Regular season

|-
!colspan=9 style=| Southland Conference season

|-
!colspan=9 style=| Southland tournament

|-
!colspan=9 style=| The Basketball Classic

Source

Notes

References

Southeastern Louisiana
Southeastern Louisiana Lions basketball seasons
Southeastern Louisiana Lions basketball
Southeastern Louisiana Lions basketball
Southeastern Louisiana